This article concerns the period 729 BC – 720 BC.

Events and trends
 728 BC—Piye invades Egypt, conquering Memphis, and receives the submission of the rulers of the Nile Delta. He founds the Twenty-fifth Dynasty of Egypt.
 728 BC—Diocles of Corinth wins the stadion race at the 13th Olympic Games.
 727 BC—Babylonia makes itself independent of Assyria, upon the death of Tiglath-Pileser III.
 725 BC—Shalmaneser V starts a 3-year siege of Israel.
 725 BC—Sparta conquers the neighboring region of Messenia and takes over the land.
 724 BC—The Assyrians start a four-year siege of Tyre.
 724 BC—The diaulos footrace is first introduced at the Olympics.

 724 BC—Desmon of Corinth wins the stadion race at the 14th Olympic Games.
 722 BC—In the fifth month of the year during the summer, Duke Zhuang of Zheng defeats his younger brother Gongshu Duan north of present-day Yanling County.
 722 BC—Northern Kingdom of Israel is conquered by Assyrian king Sargon II.
 722 BC—Duke Yin accedes to the throne of Lu in China, the first event recorded in the Spring and Autumn Annals.
 721 BC—The Assyrians conquer the tribes of northern Israel.
 721 BC—Sargon II starts to rule. He builds a new capital at Dur Sharrukin (modern Khorsabad).
 720 BC—End of the Assyrian siege of Tyre.
 720 BC—Orsippus of Megara wins the stadion race at the 15th Olympic Games.
 The "dolichos" footrace is introduced at the Olympics.
 c. 720 BC—Guardian figure (pictured, right), from the entrance to the throne room at palace of Sargon II is made. It is now kept in the Oriental Institute, Chicago.

Significant people
729 BC—Tiglath-Pileser III officially crowned sovereign of Asia in Babylon.
729 BC—Hezekiah succeeds Ahaz as king of Judah (or 726 BC).
729 BC—Luli succeeds Mattan II as king of Tyre.
728 BC—Death of  Tiglath-Pileser III, king of Assyria (or 727 BC).
727 BC—Shalmaneser V becomes king of Assyria (dies 722 BC).
727 BC—Tefnakhte founds the Twenty-fourth dynasty of Egypt.
726 BC—Hezekiah succeeds Ahaz as king of Judah (or 729 BC).
725 BC—Bakenranef (also known as Bocchoris) succeeds his father Tefnakhte as king of the Twenty-fourth dynasty of Egypt.
724 BC—Ahaz, king of Judah (740 BC–726 BC) dies.
722 BC—Shalmaneser V, king of Assyria, dies.
722 BC—Sargon succeeds Shalmaneser V as king of Assyria.
721 BC—Shabaka succeeds his father Piye as king of the Twenty-fifth Dynasty of Egypt.
720 BC—Shabaka kills Bakenranef (Bocchoris), ending the Twenty-fourth Dynasty of Egypt
720 BC—Death of King Ping of the Zhou Dynasty of China.
c. 720 BC—Birth of Guan Zhong, political adviser of Qi in eastern Ancient China.

References